Simon Rolfes (born 21 January 1982) is a German professional football official and a former player who played as a defensive midfielder. He is the managing director of sport for Bayer Leverkusen.

Club career

Early career
Rolfes started his career at Werder Bremen after progressing through their academy. During the 2000–01 season, he scored five goals in 26 league appearances for the reserve team. He scored against Dresdner SC, Fortuna Düsseldorf, Lüneburger SK, Erzgebirge Aue, and Fortuna Köln. He also made an appearances in the DFB-Pokal. He would score seven goals in 31 league appearances and a goal in two DFB-Pokal during the 2001–02 season and two goals in 17 league appearances and an appearance during the DFB-Pokal during the 2002–03 season. He also made a UEFA Cup appearance for the first team during the 2002–03 season. The match was an 8–0 against Metalurh Donetsk on 3 October 2002. He came on in the 68th minute during for Krisztián Lisztes. He then was loaned for the remainder of the season with SSV Reutlingen 05 where he made 13 appearances. In his final season with the reserve team, he scored four goals in 26 league appearances. He made exactly 100 league appearances and four DFB-Pokal appearances for the reserve team and managed to notch 19 goals (one in the DFB-Pokal) from his defensive midfield position.

Despite his good form, SV Werder Bremen manager Thomas Schaaf did not feature him as a regular, so in 2004 he moved to Alemannia Aachen and scored three goals in 28 league appearances in his one season there. He also made two appearances in the DFB-Pokal and seven appearances in the UEFA Cup.

Bayer Leverkusen
Year 2005 came out to be a crucial year for Rolfes, with Bayer Leverkusen signing him and since then he has become a fan favorite, quickly winning a regular spot and not much after, captaincy in the full squad. He appeared in 37 matches in the 2005–06 season, 49 in the 2006–07 season, 47 in the 2007–08 season, and 39 in the 2008–09 season. Rolfes suffered a serious knee injury on 2 July 2009. During the 2009–10 season, Rolfes missed matchdays 10 to 17 and made his final appearance on matchday 19 against 1899 Hoffenheim. He made only 13 appearances in all competitions during the season. He missed out on the 2010 FIFA World Cup in South Africa. He returned to fitness the following season. He appeared in 36 matches in all competitions. He continued to be a regular late into his career. He made 40 appearances in the 2011–12 and 2012–13 seasons, 43 in 2013–14 season, and 33 in the 2014–15 season. On 7 December 2014, he announced his decision to retire from football after the 2014–15 season.

International career

Rolfes made his international debut for Germany in a friendly against Denmark on 28 March 2007 in Duisburg.

He was part of the German team that finished as runners-up at Euro 2008. Rolfes started in the quarter-finals against Portugal in Basel, which Germany won 3–2, and started the semi-finals against Turkey, also in Basel, which they also won 3–2. Rolfes scored his first goal on 6 September 2008 in a 2010 World Cup qualifier, a 6–0 win against Liechtenstein. Rolfes was set to be called up to German squad for the 2010 FIFA World Cup, but he got injured and missed the competition and more than ten first games of the 2010–11 season for the "Werkself".

Personal life
Rolfes married his wife, Jenny on 12 June 2009. The couple has three daughters: Livia-Marie (born 24 May 2010), Victoria Amelie (born 27 November 2012) and Charlotte Sophie (born 17 July 2015).

Career statistics

Club

1.Includes UEFA Champions League and UEFA Cup/Europa League.

International

Scores and results list Germany's goal tally first, score column indicates score after each Rolfes goal.

Honours
Bayer Leverkusen
 DFB-Pokal runner-up: 2008–09
 Bundesliga runner-up: 2010–11

References

External links
 
 
 
 
 Leverkusen who's who

1982 births
Living people
People from Ibbenbüren
Sportspeople from Münster (region)
German footballers
Germany international footballers
Germany under-21 international footballers
SV Werder Bremen players
SV Werder Bremen II players
Alemannia Aachen players
Bayer 04 Leverkusen players
SSV Reutlingen 05 players
UEFA Euro 2008 players
Germany B international footballers
Bundesliga players
2. Bundesliga players
Association football midfielders
Footballers from North Rhine-Westphalia